Italian automobile company Lancia was the first to manufacture cars with V4 and V6 engines in series-production. This started with a number of V4-engine families, that were produced from the 1920s through 1970s.

The Lancia V4 pioneered the narrow-angle V engine design, more recently seen in Volkswagen's VR5 and VR6 engines. By using very shallow V-angles — between 10° and 20° — both rows of cylinders could be housed in an engine block with a single cylinder head, like a straight engine. A determining characteristic was the use of overhead camshafts (either single or double), in which a camshaft would serve the same function for all cylinders — in both cylinder banks.

Lambda

The first V4 was used in the Lambda from 1922 through 1931. It was a 20° narrow-angle aluminium design. All three engine displacements shared the same long  stroke, and all were SOHC designs with a single camshaft serving both banks of cylinders.

Engines:
  ,  at 3250 rpm
  ,  at 3250 rpm
  ,  at 3500 rpm

Artena
The Lambda engine was updated for the Artena.

Augusta
An all-new V4 was designed for the Augusta. Produced from 1934 through 1938, the Augusta's engine displaced  with a  bore and stroke.

Aprilia
The engine was redesigned again for 1936's Aprilia. The first-series cars used a  version with a  bore and stroke.

A second series was unveiled for 1939 with an enlarged  engine.

Ardea

A small V4 (tipo 100) powered the compact 1939 Ardea. It was a 20° narrow-angle engine displacing just .

Appia

The V4 returned after the war with the 1953 Appia. It featured an even narrower 10° cylinder bank and just  of displacement, fitting below Italy's 1.1-liter tax threshold.

Fulvia
Lancia's final V4 series were used in the Fulvia, remaining in production up until 1976. Designed by Ettore Zaccone Mina, it used a narrow angle (13°) and was mounted well forward at a 45° angle. The engine was a true DOHC design with one camshaft operating all intake valves and another operating all exhaust valves.

A higher (9.0:1) compression ratio raised power to  soon after.

The engine was re-engineered with a slightly narrower bank angle and longer  stroke for 1967. Three displacements were produced:   bore,   bore, and   bore. The latter engine is most common, with the first unit only sold in Greece.

The engine was redone again for a new HF with an even narrower 11° cylinder bank and longer  stroke for its final incarnation.

See also
 Volkswagen VR6 engine, for a more technically detailed article about narrow-angle V-engines

External links

 Lancisti.net - An Information Exchange and Support Community for Lancia Owners and Enthusiasts
 
 

V4
Gasoline engines by model
V4 engines